Abraham Darby may refer to:

People
Abraham Darby I (1678–1717) the first of several men of that name in an English Quaker family that played an important role in the Industrial Revolution. He developed a new method of producing pig iron with coke
Abraham Darby II (1711–1763) the second notable Abraham Darby, son of the first
Abraham Darby III (1750–1789) the third Abraham Darby, son of the second, known for the building of the world's first iron bridge at a place later known as Ironbridge 
Abraham Darby IV (1804–1878), High Sheriff of Buckinghamshire, a great nephew of the third Abraham Darby

Other uses
Rosa 'Abraham Darby', a rose cultivar
Abraham Darby Specialist School for the Performing Arts, a school in Telford, England